The Ye Olde Mitre is a Grade II listed public house at 1 Ely Court, Ely Place, Holborn, London EC1N 6SJ.

It is on the Campaign for Real Ale's National Inventory of Historic Pub Interiors.

Historic England documents indicate that the pub was built about 1773, and remodelled internally in the early 20th century. 

The pub's website reports the original build year as 1546 with building expansion occurring in 1782, and remodelled in the early 1930s. It is run by Fuller.

References

External links 
 

Georgian architecture in the London Borough of Camden
Grade II listed buildings in the London Borough of Camden
Grade II listed pubs in London
Commercial buildings completed in 1773
National Inventory Pubs
Buildings and structures in Holborn
Pubs in the London Borough of Camden
1773 establishments in Great Britain
Fuller's pubs